Ragnvald Dahl  (13 July 1938 – 25 February 2018) was a Norwegian civil servant and politician.

He was elected deputy representative to the Storting from Oslo for the period 1969–1973 for the Conservative Party. In total he met during 1 day of parliamentary session.

References

1938 births
2018 deaths
Politicians from Oslo
Conservative Party (Norway) politicians
Deputy members of the Storting